The Campo Argentino del Polo (Argentine Polo Ground), popularly known as The Cathedral of Polo, is a multi-purpose stadium in Buenos Aires, Argentina. It is currently used mostly for polo, pato and field hockey matches.

The stadium, opened in 1928, holds up to 30,000 people and is located in the Palermo neighbourhood, on Del Libertador Avenue, close to Hipódromo Argentino.

This is a unique polo field, situated ten minutes away from downtown Buenos Aires, and is considered the most modern and comfortable for spectators in the sport. The Campo Argentino, is the home to the Campeonato Argentino Abierto de Polo, the most important polo event in the world, held there since 1928. It is organized by the Asociación Argentina de Polo.

History

The Campo Argentino was erected on the same land where the Sociedad Sportiva Argentina stadium had been located since its establishment in 1899 until its expropriation from the Government of Argentina in 1914, when the National Army took over the stadium after the second period of five years (counting from 1909) came to an end. Ten years later, the Ministry of War led by Agustín P. Justo expropriated the lands and transferred them to the Army, which is its owner since then.

After taking the lands, the Army built two polo fields (known as "canchas 1 y 2"). The Campo Argentino was officially inaugurated on October 27, 1928, with a match between civilian and military teams (named "Civiles" and "Militares" respectively). The Army has rented Campo Argentino to the Argentine Polo Association since then.

In 1978, the Campo Argentino was the venue for all the matches of the World Field Hockey Cup, won by Pakistan. A total of seven hockey fields were specially prepared on the canchas 1 and 2 for the occasion.

Defunct competition America's Polo Cup ("Copa de las Américas") took place in Campo Argentino on numerous occasions. In this classic match, the best team from Argentina played against the best one from the United States.

The stadium has been also used for music concerts. Metallica, Oasis, Jamiroquai, Santana, Shakira, Neil Young, R.E.M., Beck, Backstreet Boys, Luciano Pavarotti, Luis Miguel, Ed Sheeran, Paul McCartney, The Pretenders and Phil Collins are some of the artists who have performed at Campo Argentino.

List of concerts

See also

Sociedad Sportiva Argentina

References

External links

 Campo Argentino de Polo at GCBA

Field hockey venues in Argentina
Polo in Argentina
Sports venues in Buenos Aires
Multi-purpose stadiums in Argentina
Sports venues completed in 1928